Mit Abu Ghaleb is a village in Damietta Governorate, Egypt.

See also 

 List of cities and towns in Egypt

References 

Populated places in Damietta Governorate